Albert Allen Bartlett (March 21, 1923 –  September 7, 2013) was an emeritus professor of physics at the University of Colorado at Boulder, US.  Professor Bartlett had lectured over 1,742 times since September, 1969 on Arithmetic, Population, and Energy. Bartlett regarded the word combination "sustainable growth" as an oxymoron, and argued that modest annual percentage population increases could lead to exponential growth. He therefore regarded human overpopulation as "The Greatest Challenge" facing humanity.

Career
Bartlett received a B.A. in physics at Colgate University (1944), and an M.A. (1948) and Ph.D. (1951) in physics at Harvard University. Bartlett joined the faculty at the University of Colorado at Boulder in September 1950. In 1978 he was national president of the American Association of Physics Teachers. He was a fellow of the American Physical Society and of the American Association for the Advancement of Science. In 1969 and 1970 he served two terms as the elected chair of the four-campus faculty council at the university. He won the Robert A. Millikan award.

Views on population growth

Bartlett viewed sustainable growth as a contradiction. His view was that modest percentage growth will equate to huge escalations over relatively short periods of time.

Over time, Bartlett argued, compound growth can yield enormous increases. For example, an investor earning a constant annual 7% return on their investment would find his or her capital doubling within 10 years. He applied the same exponential power to human population, and argued this would have calamitous results. He argued that a population of 10,000 individuals, if it were to grow at a constant rate of 7% per annum, would reach a population size of 10 million after 100 years.

Bartlett regarded what he viewed as the failure to understand exponential growth as "The Greatest Challenge" facing humanity, and promoted sustainable living; he was an early advocate on the topic of overpopulation. He opposed the cornucopian school of thought (as advocated by people such as Julian Lincoln Simon), and referred to it as "The New Flat Earth Society".

J. B. Calvert (1999) has proposed that Bartlett's law will result in the exhaustion of petrochemical resources caused by exponential growth of the world population (in line with the Malthusian Growth Model).

Bartlett made statements relating to sustainability:

"The greatest shortcoming of the human race is our inability to understand the exponential function."

and his Great Challenge:

"Can you think of any problem in any area of human endeavor on any scale, from microscopic to global, whose long-term solution is in any demonstrable way aided, assisted, or advanced by further increases in population, locally, nationally, or globally?"

Death
Bartlett died on September 7, 2013.

Books
 The Essential Exponential For the Future of Our Planet a collection of essays by Professor Bartlett (2004). Center for Science, Mathematics and Computer Education, University of Nebraska-Lincoln.

Influence and legacy

In August 2013, a month before Bartlett's death, the Environmental Center at the University of Colorado at Boulder offered training on giving his presentation; the team "came together because they believe so strongly in Dr. Bartlett's message and want to ensure it continues to be delivered well into the future".

See also
 M. King Hubbert, author of the Hubbert Curve.
 Thomas Robert Malthus – the originator of the Malthusian catastrophe argument
 Peak oil

Notes

References
 Professor talks at an exponential rate, Energy Bulletin article by Todd Neff. Retrieved July 2011

External links
 
2008 Video interview with Albert Bartlett by Atomic Heritage Foundation Voices of the Manhattan Project
Professor Bartlett's website contains background, articles, book "The Essential Exponential", and links to his talk, "Arithmetic, Population, and Energy". Retrieved July 2011
Professor Bartlett's page at the University of Colorado Retrieved July 2011
Biography of Dr Bartlett Retrieved July 2011
"Arithmetic, Population, and Energy" by Professor Albert Bartlett Free audio and video 57 minute lecture. Retrieved July 2011
"Arithmetic, Population, and Energy" by Professor Albert Bartlett Text of lecture (extracts). Retrieved July 2011
Analysis of Bartlett's "Arithmetic, Population, and Energy" presentation – Exponentialist website. Retrieved July 2011
Is There a Population Problem? Ecofuture website. Retrieved July 2011
The Massive Movement to Marginalise the Modern Malthusian Message article by Professor Bartlett. Retrieved July 2011
Thoughts on Long-term Energy Supplies - Scientists and the Silent Lie article on energy and population in Physics Today (2004). Retrieved July 2011
Clean Coal Technology Speech by Andrew McNamara MP on clean coal and report by Professor Bartlett
 (Part 1 of 8), (parts 2-4 are linked). Retrieved July 2011
 (Part 5 of 8), (parts 6-8 are linked). Retrieved July 2011
Arithmetic, Population & Energy @Google (entire video). Retrieved July 2011
Lecture by Professor Bartlett about the exponential function @Vimeo. Retrieved December 2013
hour-long interview with Professor Bartlett by  CU Outreach @Vimeo. Retrieved December 2013
BLIND SPOT, Documentary, Population & Energy. Retrieved July 2011

1923 births
2013 deaths
American physicists
Colgate University alumni
Harvard School of Engineering and Applied Sciences alumni
Science teachers
Sustainability advocates
University of Colorado faculty
University of Colorado Boulder faculty
Scientists from New York (state)
Fellows of the American Physical Society